The New York Jets, originally known as the Titans of New York from the team's conception in 1960 until 1962, joined the NFL as part of the 1970 AFL–NFL merger, two years after defeating the Baltimore Colts 16–7 in Super Bowl III.

The Titans made their first American Football League Draft selection in 1961. They chose Tom Brown, a defensive lineman/guard from the University of Minnesota, known as the "Rock of Gibraltar", who won the 1960 Outland Trophy as the nation's best lineman and finished 2nd in the Heisman Trophy voting. Brown later became a College Football Hall of Famer and Canadian Football Hall of Famer.

In 1970, the Jets selected Steve Tannen, a defensive back from the University of Florida, as their first pick in the NFL Draft. The team has most recently selected Zach Wilson, a quarterback from BYU and Alijah Vera-Tucker, a guard from USC in 2021.

Every year during April, each NFL franchise seeks to add new players to its roster through a collegiate draft known as "the NFL Annual Player Selection Meeting", which is more commonly known as the NFL Draft. Teams are ranked in inverse order based on the previous season's record, with the worst record picking first, and the second worst picking second and so on. The two exceptions to this order are made for teams that appeared in the previous Super Bowl; the Super Bowl champion always picks 32nd, and the Super Bowl loser always picks 31st. Teams have the option of trading away their picks to other teams for different picks, players, cash, or a combination thereof. Thus, it is not uncommon for a team's actual draft pick to differ from their assigned draft pick, or for a team to have extra or no draft picks in any round due to these trades.

The Jets have selected the number one overall pick one time: Keyshawn Johnson, a wide receiver from the University of Southern California in the 1996 NFL Draft. The team has also selected number two overall twice and number three overall once. The Jets have selected players from University of Southern California seven times, from the Ohio State University six times, five times from the University of Alabama and three times each from the University of Virginia and University of Miami (Florida). Two eventual Hall of Famers were selected by the Jets: Joe Namath and John Riggins.

Key

Player selections

Asterisks after active season numbers denote that the player is still active. Asterisks after seasons with Jets numbers denote player is still with the Jets.

Footnotes

References 

 
 
 
 
 

New York Jets

first-round draft picks